The men's K-1 500 metres event was an individual kayaking event conducted as part of the Canoeing at the 2000 Summer Olympics program.

Medalists

Results

Heats
31 competitors first raced in four heats. The top six finishers from each of the heats and the three fastest finishers advanced directly to the semifinals.

Overall Results Heats

Semifinals
The top three finishers in each of the three semifinals advanced to the final.

Gurshikhin's disqualification was not disclosed in the official report.

Overall Results Semi-Finals

Final

The final was delayed six hours to strong winds of 50 mph (80 km/h), a race official sinking in his aluminum dinghy, start lanes for lanes seven and eight being broken prior to the start, and 30 spectators stripping to their underwear to swim to the medal podium only to be taken into custody by police and security personnel. Except for Kolganov edging pre-Olympic favorite Vereckei at the line, the race itself was generally unevental.

References
2000 Summer Olympics Canoe sprint results. 
Sports-reference.com 2000 men's K-1 500 m results
Wallechinsky, David and Jaime Loucky (2008). "Canoeing: Men's Kayak Singles 500 Meters". In The Complete Book of the Olympics: 2008 Edition. London: Aurum Press Limited. p. 470.

Men's K-1 500
Men's events at the 2000 Summer Olympics